The 14th Vuelta a España (Tour of Spain), a long-distance bicycle stage race and one of the three grand tours, was held from 24 April to 10 May 1959. Suárez also won the mountains classification while Rik Van Looy won the points classification.

Teams and riders

Route

Results

References

 
1959
1959 in Spanish sport
1959 in road cycling